The genus Tamarix (tamarisk, salt cedar, taray) is composed of about 50–60 species of flowering plants in the family Tamaricaceae, native to drier areas of Eurasia and Africa. The generic name originated in Latin and may refer to the Tamaris River in Hispania Tarraconensis (Spain).

Description
They usually grow on saline soils, tolerating up to 15,000 ppm soluble salt, and can also tolerate alkaline conditions.

Tamarisks are characterized by slender branches and grey-green foliage. The bark of young branches is smooth and reddish brown. As the plants age, the bark becomes gray-brown, ridged and furrowed.

The leaves are scale-like, almost like that of junipers, 1–2 mm (1/20" to 1/10") long, and overlap each other along the stem. They are often encrusted with salt secretions.

The pink to white flowers appear in dense masses on 5–10 cm (2" to 4") long spikes at branch tips from March to September, though some species (e.g., T. aphylla) tend to flower in the summer till as late as November.

Ecology
Tamarix aphylla can spread both vegetatively, by submerged stems producing adventitious roots, and sexually, by seeds. Each flower can produce thousands of tiny (1 mm; 1/20" diameter) seeds that are contained in a small capsule usually adorned with a tuft of hair that aids in wind dispersal. Seeds can also be dispersed by water. Seedlings require extended periods of soil saturation for establishment. Tamarisk trees are most often propagated by cuttings.

These trees grow in disturbed and undisturbed streams, waterways, bottom lands, banks, and drainage washes of natural or artificial water bodies, moist rangelands and pastures.

It is unclear if Tamarix species are fire-adapted, but in many cases a large proportion of the trees are able to resprout from the stump after fires, although not notably more so than other riverine species. They likely cannot resprout from root suckers. In some habitats where they are native, wildfire appears to favour the establishment of riverine trees such as Populus, to the detriment of Tamarix. Conversely, they do appear to be more flammable, with more dead wood produced and debris held aloft. In the southwestern USA, most stands studied appear to be burning at faster intervals than they can fully mature and die of natural causes.

Tamarix species are used as food plants by the larvae of some Lepidoptera species including Coleophora asthenella which feeds exclusively on T. africana.

Uses
Tamarisk species are used as ornamental shrubs, windbreaks, and shade trees: notably T. ramosissima and T. tetrandra.
In the American Southwest, Tamarisk was introduced to help erosion control.
In Greece Tamarisk – known locally as almyriki is cooked and eaten as a wild green vegetable. 
The wood was used by the Saka (combined with wood and ibex horn) to produce tremendously powerful bows hundreds of years before the common era.
The wood may be used for carpentry or firewood: it is a possible agroforestry species
At certain times of year, scale insects feeding upon the tender twigs of tamarisk plants excrete a sweet substance known as honeydew, which has been gathered for use as a food source and sweetener for thousands of years. The substance is also known locally as manna, and some scholars have suggested that this substance is the biblical manna that fed the Israelites during their flight from Egypt, though others dispute this interpretation
Plans are being made for the tamarisk to play a role in anti-desertification programs in China

Invasive species
In some specific riparian habitats in the Southwestern United States and California, Tamarix ramosissima has naturalized and become an important invasive plant species. In other areas, the plants form dense monocultures that alter the natural environment and compete with native species already stressed by human activity. Recent scientific investigations have generally concluded that the primary human-caused impact to desert riparian ecosystems within the Colorado River Basin is the alteration of the flood regime by dams; Tamarix ramosissima is relatively tolerant of this hydrologic alteration compared to flood-dependent native woody riparian species such as willow, cottonwood, and box elder.

Competition with native plants
Research on competition between tamarisk seedlings and co-occurring native trees has found that Tamarix seedlings are not competitive over a range of environments, but stands of mature trees effectively prevent native species' establishment in the understory, due to low light, elevated salinity, and possibly changes to the soil biota. Box elder (Acer negundo, a native riparian tree) seedlings survive and grow under higher-shade conditions than Tamarix seedlings, and mature Tamarix specimens die after 1–2 years of 98% shade, indicating a pathway for successional replacement of Tamarix by box elder. Anthropogenic activities that preferentially favor tamarisk (such as changes to flooding regimens) are associated with infestation. To date, Tamarix has taken over large sections of riparian ecosystems in the western United States that were once home to native cottonwoods and willows, and are projected by some to spread well beyond the current range.

In a 2013 study which examined if native plant growth was hindered by the microbiota associated with the presence of Tamarix, a relatively new invasive plant to the northern United States, Elymus lanceolatus and other native plants in fact grew better when a small soil sample from areas where Tamarix trees grew was mixed in with the potting soil, as opposed to samples without these plants. This was thought to indicate the presence of beneficial mycorrhizae. The presence of Tamarix plants has also been shown to boost soil fertility in a number of studies, and it also increases soil salinity. Two studies found that Tamarix plants are able to limit the recruitment of Salix and Populus tree species, in the latter case possibly due to interfering with the trees ability to form symbiotic relationships with arbuscular mycorrhizal fungi, in contrast to the grass and legume species studied in 2013.

Because it is much more efficient at both obtaining water from drying soil and conserving water during drought, it can outcompete many native species, especially after the habitat is altered by controlling flood regimes and disturbance of water sources. Because the trees are able to concentrate salts on the outside of their leaves, dense stands of the tree will form a layer of high salinity on the topsoil as the leaves are shed. Although this layer is easily washed off during flooding events, in areas where the rivers are channelled and floods are controlled, this salty layer inhibits the germination of a number of native plants. However, a study involving more than a thousand soil samples across gradients of both flood frequency and Tamarix density concluded that "flooding may be the most important factor for assessing floodplain salinity" and "soils under Tamarix canopies had lower surface soil salinity than open areas deprived of flooding suggesting that surface evaporation may contribute more to surface soil salinity than Tamarix".

Investigation of effects of invasion
Tamarix species are commonly believed to disrupt the structure and stability of North American native plant communities and degrade native wildlife habitat, by outcompeting and replacing native plant species, salinizing soils, monopolizing limited sources of moisture, and increasing the frequency, intensity, and effect of fires and floods . While individual plants may not consume larger quantities of water than native species, large, dense stands of tamarisk do consume more water than equivalent stands of native cottonwoods. An active and ongoing debate exists as to when the tamarisk can out-compete native plants, and if it is actively displacing native plants or it just taking advantage of disturbance by removal of natives by humans and changes in flood regimens.

Controls
Pest populations of tamarisk in the United States can be dealt with in several ways. The National Park Service has used the methods of physically removing the plants, spraying them with herbicides, and introducing northern tamarisk beetles (Diorhabda carinulata) in the national park system. Various attempts to control tamarisk have been implemented on federal lands including Dinosaur National Monument, San Andres National Wildlife Refuge, and White Sands Missile Range. After years of study, the USDA Agricultural Research Service found that the introduced tamarisk beetles (Diorhabda elongata) eat only the tamarisk, and starve when no more is available, not eating any plants native to North America.

Selected species

Tamarix africana Poir.
Tamarix androssowii 
Tamarix aphylla (L.) H.Karst.
Tamarix arceuthoides
Tamarix articulata
Tamarix austromongolica 
Tamarix boveana
Tamarix canariensis
Tamarix chinensis Lour.
Tamarix dalmatica
Tamarix dioica Roxb. ex Roth
Tamarix duezenlii
Tamarix elongata
Tamarix gallica L.
Tamarix gansuensis
Tamarix gennessarensis Zohary
Tamarix gracilis Willd.
Tamarix hampeana
Tamarix hispida Willd.
Tamarix indica
Tamarix jintaenia
Tamarix juniperina
Tamarix jordanis
Tamarix karelinii Bunge
Tamarix laxa Willd.
Tamarix leptostachys
Tamarix mannifera (Ehrenb.) Bunge
Tamarix mongolica
Tamarix negevensis
Tamarix nilotica
Tamarix parviflora DC.
Tamarix ramosissima Ledeb.
Tamarix sachuensis
Tamarix senegalensis DC.
Tamarix smyrnensis Bunge (=T. hohenackeri)
Tamarix taklamakanensis
Tamarix tarimensis
Tamarix tenuissima
Tamarix tetragyna Ehrenb.
Tamarix tetragyna var. meyeri (Boiss.) Boiss. (=T. meyeri)
Tamarix tetragyna var. tetragyna
Tamarix tetrandra Pall. ex M.Bieb.
Tamarix usneoides E.Mey. ex Bunge

Formerly placed here
Myricaria germanica (L.) Desv. (as T. germanica L.)

Tamarisk in North America
The tamarisk was introduced to the United States as an ornamental shrub, a windbreak, and a shade tree in the early 19th century. In the 1930s, during the Great Depression, tree-planting was used as a tool to fight soil erosion on the Great Plains, and different trees were planted by the millions in the Great Plains Shelterbelt, including salt cedars.

Eight species are found in North America. They can be divided into two subgroups:

 Evergreen species
Tamarix aphylla (Athel tree), a large evergreen tree, does not sexually reproduce in the local climate and is not considered a seriously invasive species. The Athel tree is commonly used for windbreaks on the edge of agricultural fields and as a shade tree in the deserts of the Southwestern United States.

 Deciduous species
The second subgroup contains the deciduous tamarisks, which are small, shrubby trees, commonly known as "saltcedars". These include T. pentandra, T. tetrandra, T. gallica, T. chinensis, T. ramosissima and T. parviflora.

Cultural history
In the Epic of Gilgamesh, Gilgamesh's mother, the goddess Ninsun, ceremoniously bathes in a bath of "tamarisk" and soapwort before allowing Gilgamesh and Enkidu to begin their conquest.

In the Iliad 10.466 Odysseus and Diomedes hide the spoils of Dolon in a tamarisk tree. In myth, Myrica was a young woman who was transformed into a tamarisk.

In the Iliad 21.18 Achilles leaves his spear aside among the tamarisks by the banks of the river Xanthus.

In Genesis 21:33, Abraham is recorded to have "planted a tamarisk at Beer-sheba". He had built a well there, earlier.
In 1 Samuel 22:6, Saul is sitting under a tamarisk tree on a hill at Gibeah when he learns that David has returned to Judah.

In 1 Samuel 31:13, Saul's bones are buried under a tamarisk tree in Jabesh.

In Shahnameh, only a tamarisk arrow to the eye can wound the otherwise invincible Prince Esfandiar.

In the Quran 34:16, the people of Saba were punished when "[Allah] converted their two garden (rows) into gardens producing bitter fruit and tamarisks...".

In Egyptian mythology, the body of Osiris is hidden for a time in a tamarisk tree in Byblos, until it was retrieved by Isis. A reference to this is also made in the computer game, Age of Mythology, in which the head of Osiris is said to be hidden inside the trunk of a great tamarisk tree.

Wedgwood made a "Tamarisk" China pattern.

According to the New Larousse Encyclopedia of Mythology, the tamarisk plant is a favorite of the Greek god Apollo.

The tamarisk features heavily in Paolo Bacigalupi's short story, "The Tamarisk Hunter". The story depicts a man in a drought-stricken near future who uproots and collects tamarisk plants in exchange for state-paid bounties. The story is collected in Bacigalupi's short story collection, Pump Six.

References

Further reading

External links

Species Profile - Saltcedar (Tamarix spp.), National Invasive Species Information Center, United States National Agricultural Library. Lists general information and resources for Saltcedar.
Flora Europaea Tamarix
Least Wanted: Salt Cedar, Plant Conservation Alliance's Alien Plant Working Group
Tamarix, a natural resource on which the communities depend for fuelwood, tools, and basket making.
Introduction of the Tamarisk Beetle in Dinosaur National Monument
Saltcedar – Center for Invasive Species Research, University of California

 
Taxa named by Carl Linnaeus